Antipater of Derbe was a tyrant or prince of Derbe. He was a friend of Cicero's, one of whose letters, of uncertain date, is addressed on Antipater's behalf to Quintus Philippus, proconsul of the province of Asia, who was offended with Antipater and therefore held his sons hostage.

Amyntas, the Lycaonian chieftain, murdered him and seized his principality.

References

1st-century BC rulers in Asia
Correspondents of Cicero
People from Roman Anatolia